The 2009-10 Oman First Division League (known as the Omantel First Division League for sponsorship reasons) is the 34th edition of the second-highest division overall football league in Oman. The season began on 3 March 2010 and concluded on 12 May 2010.

Group stage

Group A

Group B

Semifinals
4 teams played a knockout tie. 2 ties were played over two legs. The first match was played between Fanja SC and Salalah SC on 28 April 2010.

1st Legs

2nd Legs

3/4th Place match

Finals

Promotion/relegation play-off

1st Leg

2nd Leg

''Al Oruba secured promotion after winning 2:1 on aggregate

References

Oman First Division League seasons
Oman
2009–10 in Omani football